Ballytarsna is the name of townlands in several counties in Ireland. It may refer to:
Ballytarsna, County Carlow
Ballytarsna, County Clare
Ballytarsna, County Kilkenny
Ballytarsna, County Laois
Ballytarsna, County Roscommon
Ballytarsna, County Tipperary (disambiguation), several places
Ballytarsna, County Wexford